Kirchdorf an der Krems is a town in the Austrian state of Upper Austria on the river Krems, in the district of  Kirchdorf an der Krems. Apparently settled by the year 903, it has 4,104 inhabitants in a relatively small area of 3 km.

Population

Personalities
 Max Grod%C3%A9nchik, actor
 Gerlinde Kaltenbrunner, mountaineer
 Juliana Neuhuber, filmmaker and artist
 Josef Redtenbacher, chemist
 Ludwig Redtenbacher, physicist and entomologist
 Josef Redtenbacher, entomologist, and nephew of Ludwig Redtenbacher
 Carlos von Riefel, botanical artist

References

Cities and towns in Kirchdorf an der Krems District